The 1954–55 Serie C was the seventeenth edition of Serie C, the third highest league in the Italian football league system.

Final classification

Bari ranked 1st for best goal average.

Relegation tie-breaker

Fanfulla relegated to IV Serie.

Serie C seasons
3
Italy